Events in the year 2023 in Austria.

Incumbents 
 President: Alexander Van der Bellen
 Chancellor: Karl Nehammer

Governors 
 Burgenland: Hans Peter Doskozil
 Carinthia: Peter Kaiser
 Lower Austria: Johanna Mikl-Leitner
 Salzburg: Wilfried Haslauer Jr.
 Styria: Christopher Drexler
 Tyrol: Anton Mattle
 Upper Austria: Thomas Stelzer
 Vienna: Michael Ludwig
 Vorarlberg: Markus Wallner

Events 
 10 January: the Criminal Court of Vienna acquitted former FPO leader Heinz-Christian Strache, citing lack of proof. 
 29 January: 2023 Lower Austrian state election
 5 February: Avalanches kill eight tourists in the Alps.
Scheduled
 5 March: 2023 Carinthian state election
 23 April: 2023 Salzburg state election

Sports

Scheduled 
 2022–23 Austrian Football Bundesliga
 2022–23 Austrian Cup
 Austrian Grand Prix
 2023 ACCR Formula 4 Championship

References 

 
Austria
Austria
2020s in Austria
Years of the 21st century in Austria